Da Unbreakables is the sixth studio album by American hip hop group Three 6 Mafia. The album was released on June 24, 2003 by Hypnotize Minds and Columbia Records. The album features Lord Infamous, DJ Paul, Juicy J and Crunchy Black. Gangsta Boo and Koopsta Knicca both left to pursue solo careers.

The album was certified Gold by the RIAA.

Track listing
All tracks are produced by DJ Paul and Juicy J

Charts

Weekly charts

Year-end charts

Certifications

References

2003 albums
Three 6 Mafia albums
Loud Records albums
Hardcore hip hop albums
Albums produced by DJ Paul
Albums produced by Juicy J